Maximus Inc. is an American government services company, with global operations in countries including the United States, Australia, Canada, and the United Kingdom. The company contracts with government agencies to provide services to manage and administer government-sponsored programs. Maximus provides administration and other services for Medicaid, Medicare, health care reform, and welfare-to-work, among other government programs. The company is based in Tysons, Virginia, has 34,300 employees and a reported annual revenue of $3.46 billion in fiscal year 2020.

History 
Maximus was founded in 1975 by David V. Mastran, a Vietnam veteran and former employee of the U.S. Department of Health, Education, and Welfare. Maximus initially operated as a consulting firm for the federal government and later became the first company to provide business process services for welfare reform. It also offered information technology services. In 1988 Maximus received its first contract for social welfare from Los Angeles County, and transitioned its business focus to operating government programs and services.

In 1997, the company went public, trading on the New York Stock Exchange under the symbol MMS. In 2004, Lynn Davenport became chief executive officer. Davenport was terminated in April 2006 for violating the company's code of conduct. Richard Montoni, former chief financial officer for Maximus, was named CEO on April 24, 2006. Montoni has been credited with improving the company's performance In 2007, the company announced it was exploring strategic alternatives, including sale, but ultimately chose to divest several business lines and focus its business in health and human services business process management.

On April 30, 2008, the organization sold its Security Solutions division. On September 30, 2008, the company sold its Justice Solutions, Education Systems, and Asset Solutions divisions. The company also completed the sale of its ERP division in 2010. In 2010, Maximus acquired DeltaWare, a developer of health administration management systems for the Canadian government health care market. In 2012, the company acquired Denver-based Policy Studies Incorporated (PSI) for $67 million. In 2013, Maximjus acquired UK-based Health Management Ltd.(HML). On April 6, 2015, the company completed the $300 million acquisition of Falls-Church-based technology contractor, Acentia. The deal significantly adds to the company's federal business by bringing on new customers and new contract vehicles. In 2018, Maximus acquired U.S. Federal citizen engagement center assets from another government contractor for $400 million in cash.

In 2018, after twelve years as CEO, Richard Montoni announced his retirement and the company appointed President Bruce Caswell to the position of chief executive officer. In 2021, Maximus acquired Attain and Veterans Evaluation Services (VES) for a combined total of $1.8 billion.

Maximus hired Dr. Arvenita Washington Cherry as Senior Director of DE&I in 2020 in an effort to bolster diversity and inclusion in its workforce. Since her arrival, Maximus has instituted new initiatives  to facilitate conversations across the company about these issues.

In September 2021, Maximus and Navient announced the two companies signed a definitive agreement  to transfer the loan servicing for U.S. Department of Education-owned student loan accounts from Navient to Maximus through a contract novation.

The Federal Student Aid (FSA) approved  the agreement in October 2021, which impacted 5.6 million student loan borrowers. Maximus created a new federal loan servicing unit, known as Aidvantage, and said in a statement, “This is a defining moment for student borrowers…it is imperative we get it right.”

In May 2022, Maximus relocated its headquarters to Tysons, Virginia and new office space that was reported to incorporate "many of the post-pandemic office designs that architects and companies are emphasizing."

Services

Health services 
Maximus provides services for government health programs including Medicaid, the Children's Health Insurance Program (CHIP), Medicare and health insurance exchanges as required under the Affordable Care Act. Maximus serves on the Enroll America advisory council.

The company is the largest provider of administrative services for Medicaid and CHIP in the United States, serving more than 50% of the market. In September 2012, the Illinois Department of Healthcare and Family Services awarded Maximus Health Services a two-year, $76.8 million contract to help the state with its Medicaid program. That same month, Maximus announced a $23.5 million contract with the State of Oklahoma to operate a customer relationship management system for SoonerCare, the state's Medicaid program, and Insure Oklahoma, a program that provides employers with subsidies to help buy private market health insurance for their low- to moderate-income employees.

Maximus is also the largest provider of privatized health insurance appeals to Medicare. In 2012 it expanded its growing Federal operations, bringing 500 local jobs to upstate New York and Pennsylvania, including more than 325 jobs in Pittsford, NY and more than 125 jobs to Scranton, PA.

The company offers services in the health insurance exchange marketplace and in July 2012, the Minnesota Department of Commerce awarded Maximus a two-year, $41 million contract to create the state's new health insurance exchange. In February 2013, Connecticut awarded Maximus a $15 million contract to run the customer contact center operations for the state's health insurance exchange, Access Health CT.

Maximus won a £500m government contract to decide whether disabled people are able to return to work after Atos abandoned their contract to perform assessments in 2014. Professor Michael O'Donnell, the former medical director of Atos now works as the medical director of Health Management Limited which is a subsidiary of Maximus.

COVID-19 Response 

In March 2020, Maximus began working with government agencies in the United States at the federal, state, and local level to assist with the pandemic response. This work initially included providing testing results and conducting contact tracing, in states such as Arizona and Indiana. In September 2020, Maximus announced the creation of Maximus Public Health to support “efforts to contain the spread of COVID-19 and toward the purchasing and distribution of vaccines."

In 2021, Maximus shifted its focus to vaccine distribution. The company worked directly with states, like Colorado, to provide information to residents and schedule vaccine appointments. In May 2021, the Center for Disease Control (CDC) announced it had selected Maximus to “support a national hotline program" for vaccine distribution.

Human services 
Maximus operates human services programs, including welfare-to-work (such as the Ticket to Work program), child support enforcement, child care, child welfare, specialized consulting, K-12 special education software and higher education consulting.

In 2011, Maximus was recognized as the top performing provider for welfare-to-work services under the United Kingdom's Flexible New Deal programme, helping job seekers into long-term sustained employment. Following the Flexible New Deal, the United Kingdom government unveiled a replacement program, called the Work Programme, that created welfare reform changes. Maximus serves as a contractor in three regions under the UK's Work Programme initiative. Its subsidiary, Centre for Health and Disability Assessments Ltd., runs Work Capability Assessments with a contract which began in 2014 and runs until July 2021.

In 2012, the company launched its first welfare-to-work program in Canada and expanded its Australia operations with a five-year contract to help people with disabilities find employment.

Maximus also provides services for child support programs. In 2009, the company won a five-year contract to collect and enforce child-support collections in Shelby County, Tennessee. Maximus launched Project NOW (Negotiating Outstanding Warrants), an initiative that collected more than $35,000 to help nearly 100 parents in Shelby County get back on track after missing child support payments.

IT Modernization 

The Maximus work with government agencies at the state, federal, and international level has evolved into more broad IT modernization work, focused on implementing emerging technologies and helping agencies transition to cloud-based platforms. This includes work with Securities and Exchange Commission (SEC) to modernize a filing and storage system that houses information on companies and work with the Internal Revenue Service (IRS) to improve the agency's technology infrastructure and support content in the cloud.

Awards and recognitions 
Gartner selected Maximus as the overall winner of the 2011 Business Process Management (BPM) Program of the Year. Maximus was also awarded top honors for the "Most Innovative Use" of BPM.

Several Maximus customer contact centers were recognized by BenchmarkPortal. BenchmarkPortal has recognized the Maximus Mass Health and Georgia Families Customer Contact Service Operations Centers, the California Health Care Options Call Center, the New York Medicaid Choice Call Center, and the Texas Eligibility Support Services Customer Contact Center.

DeltaWare, a subsidiary of Maximus, has been ranked one of the Top Places to Work for three consecutive years (2012, 2011 and 2010) by Atlantic Canada's Top Employers Competition.

In 2015, Maximus was recognized as one of the Top Companies to work for in the Washington, D.C. area by the Washington Post.

In 2017, Fortune Magazine named Maximus to its annual World's Most Admired Companies list.

Maximus has received several awards recognizing its status as a military- and diversity-friendly company. Military Times honored Maximus as a Top Employer for veterans in 2020  and Forbes named Maximus to its 2021 list of America's Best Employers for Diversity.

Sponsorships and charity

Corporate sponsorships
Maximus provides financial support to social initiatives, including the National Hispanic Health Foundation (NHHF) scholarship program targeted to leadership and service to underserved populations and the Urban League of Middle Tennessee.

In 2010, Maximus joined other Northern Virginia technology companies to provide pro bono work to help digitize mislabeled and unaccounted-for graves and upgrade a paper record-keeping system at Arlington National Cemetery, an effort that U.S. Senator Mark Warner called "corporate citizenship at its best."

In 2011, Maximus helped fund No Kid Hungry Texas, a joint initiative of Share our Strength and the Texas Hunger Initiative to reduce childhood hunger through existing nutrition plans. That same year, Maximus Australia (MAX Employment) held the Great Australian Christmas Jobs Drive campaign, which exceeded its target of getting 10,000 unemployed people into work by Christmas Day. As part of the campaign, MAX Employment donated $100,000 to The Smith Family Christmas Appeal.

In June 2015, the Maximus Foundation was recognized as a Bronze sponsor of Special Olympics Connecticut's annual Summer Games. Through their sponsorship, the Foundation helped the organization welcome more than 2,300 competitors for a weekend-long athletic competition.

The Maximus Foundation
The Maximus Foundation is a non-profit 501 (c) (3) charitable organization incorporated in the Commonwealth of Virginia that funds programs that help disadvantaged individuals achieve self-sufficiency and personal growth, particularly those programs serving kids. It is funded by charitable gifts from employees of Maximus and supplemented by grants from the company. As Chairman of the Foundation, Dr. John Boyer received a Medical Leadership award from the National Hispanic Medical Associations. In 2013, Boyer was also awarded the 2013 Ripple of Hope Award.

The Maximus Foundation awards grants biannually, once in the spring and once in the fall. In 2009, the Maternity and Early Childhood Foundation used grant support from the Maximus Foundation to upgrade aging computer equipment and build its capacity to promote quality services and provide required reports to New York State. In 2011, EMQ FamiliesFirst, a California-based non-profit agency that helps children in crisis and their families received a grant from the Maximus Foundation. In 2012, the South Bronx Overall Economic Development Corporation (SoBRO) used grant money from the Maximus Foundation to start the Greenhouse Roof Operation (GRO), a program to teach disadvantaged youth vocational skills through the construction and operation of a hydroponic farm. That same year, the Maximus Foundation awarded a $2,000 grant to United Neighborhood Centers in Scranton, Pennsylvania, as well as over $100,000 in grants, which included funding for Washington D.C non-profit organizations, such as the Alexander Graham Bell Association for the Deaf and Hard of Hearing, DEA Educational Foundation, Dreams for Kids, the Fishing School and Mary's Center for Maternal and Childcare, KEEN Greater DC, Primary Care Coalition of Montgomery County, A Wider Circle the Children's AIDS Fund, Herndon-Reston FISH, ROSMY, Safe Harbor and WETA-TV.

In the 2015 spring cycle, the Foundation announced that it distributed approximately $390,000 in grants to 121 nonprofit organizations in 22 states as part of the grant cycle. Grantees included CASA of Los Angeles and the Community Health Centers of Burlington.

In June 2015, the Maximus Foundation contributed more than $29,000 to Nepal Earthquake Relief through Project HOPE. The following month,  Manos de Cristo, a Maximus Foundation grantee, provided back-to-school supplies to more than 2,000 low-income children in the Austin, Texas area. The agency provided the children with new clothing, socks, and a brand-new backpack with school supplies.

Maximus announced that it donated $20,000 to the Charleston Shooting victims memorial fund. Half of the proceeds came from employees and was matched by the company for $20,000 total. The fund will direct the funds toward youth development, healthcare access and economic opportunity.

The Maximus Foundation helped fund the work of four high school students at Thomas Jefferson High School for Science and Technology in Alexandria, Virginia, to develop Atheia, a new technology developed during the COVID-19 pandemic to assist those with vision problems.

Criticism 

November 1997- The Hartford Courant reported that Maximus "gets minimal results" when it was hired by the State of Connecticut to manage a child care program for recipients of welfare. According to the Record-Journal, Maximus "hired too few people, installed an inadequate phone system and fell weeks or months behind in making payments to day care providers." The Connecticut Department of Social Services (DSS) asked Maximus to meet improvement goals and by December, DSS Commissioner Joyce A. Thomas noted improvements on several fronts commenting, "The good news for Connecticut's child care providers and the families we all serve is that the situation is rapidly improving. Maximus has come a long way, and we are confident that current efforts are paving the way to long-term improvements."

December 1998- The Sarasota Herald Tribune reported that the State of Florida had paid Maximus $4.5 Million for a Child Support Recovery contract.  Maximus was only able to collect $162,000. "On average taxpayers paid Maximus $25 for every 3 cents collected."

1999 - Then-mayor of New York, Rudy Giuliani held his first meetings in May 1999 introducing the city's welfare reform programs which would require adult welfare recipients to either work or train for work.  Mid-June was set as the deadline for the competition for the contracts. However, the Giuliani administration began to consult with Maxiumus executives on how the company could "reshape, consolidate and run" the programs, as early as January 1999. Starting in January, Maximus was awarded contracts worth  $500 million, which represented the "largest share" to assess and train as many as 200,000 welfare recipients and to provide job placement. New York city's comptroller said that this gave Maximus an "unfair advantage".

October 2000- Six state lawmakers in Wisconsin called for the termination of Maximus' W-2 contract, saying the firm has "broken faith with the state and poor people the agency serves in Milwaukee County."

June 2001- The Milwaukee Journal Sentinel reported that two Maximus employees filed discrimination complaints against the company.  The employees stated that Maximus is so lacking in diversity that the companies minority employees referred to it as "White Castle/"

2004 In 2004, British Columbia became the first province in Canada to outsource a large quantity of its health administration serviceswhich included Medical Services Plan and PharmaCareto the private sector, when BC Health signed the ten-year $324-million contract with Maximus. A campaign was launched in the province to protect private and personal health information. Concerns included the risk of disclosure of confidential date accessed under the Homeland Security Act.

July 2007- Maximus settled a lawsuit brought against it by the United States government for involvement in falsifying Medicaid claims for $30.5 million.

October 2010- The Los Angeles Times reported that 146 medical workers, including doctors, nurses and pharmacists were allowed to keep working despite failing drug tests.  Maximus was awarded a $2.5 Million a year contract to run California's confidential "diversion programs".  Maximus contracted the work out to a subcontractor who in turn subcontracted the work to another company.  The drug testing company was using the wrong standard of drug test from December 2009 to August 2010, resulting in medical workers who tested positive for drugs to continue working.

June 2011- Boston-based Fox25 news uncovered that a wanted fugitive by the name of Maureen Simonetti was working for Maximus as a manager on the MassHealth project and had access to the personal information of individuals who use MassHealth for their healthcare. Simonetti's attorney said his client disclosed pleading no contest to grand theft on her application to work at Maximus in 2005. However, the required Massachusetts background check, known as a CORI, did not uncover Simonetti's grand theft case in Florida, which is an out of state criminal record. Maximus stated that it had "no reason to believe that anyone's personal information was used inappropriately" and terminated Simonetti.

September 2011- Maximus Inc. was sued by U.S. Equal Employment Opportunity Commission (EEOC) for disability discrimination for failure to promote a female employee because it regarded her as disabled. Maximus settled the lawsuit in August 2012.

June 2012- Through an internal privacy audit, Maximus discovered that a worker in Canada illegally viewed personal health records of 43 Canadians. The worker involved was immediately suspended and later fired.

January 2013- A Maximus employee, Marilyn Beltran, based in Boston MA was indicted for allegedly stealing more than $490,000 from the Massachusetts Medicaid program.  The theft had occurred over a period of nine years.

February 2013 In his February 2013 report, the British Columbia auditor general said that Maximus 10-year contract with BC Health lacked adequate monitoring and had not brought the "expected benefits" it had promised. Major deadlines were not met and no penalties were laid. Desktop and laptops were not replaced as often as agreed upon. Even after almost a decade, privacy issues had not been dealt with adequately. BC Health relies solely on the company to self-report breaches. Subcontractors were not given security audits. As well, auditing does not “provide assurance that data access and storage are limited to Canada and that the data can be segregated from the service provider’s parent companies.”

March 2022 A report by the Student Borrower Protection Center and the Communications Workers of America noted consumer complaints filed against Aidvantage in relation to federal student loans, and accused Maximus, its parent company, of mismanagement.

References

External links
 
 Maximus, Inc. recipient profile on USAspending.gov
 Contract ED-FSA-09-D-0015 on USAspending.gov
Maximus Inc. profile
Yahoo's Maximus profile

Business services companies of the United States
Medicare and Medicaid (United States)
Companies based in Fairfax County, Virginia
Business services companies established in 1975
Companies listed on the New York Stock Exchange
Medical and health organizations based in Virginia
1975 establishments in Virginia